The green mango (Anthracothorax viridis) is a large species of hummingbird in the subfamily Polytminae. It is endemic to the main island of Puerto Rico.

Taxonomy and systematics

The green mango's relationship to the other species of genus Anthracothorax has not been settled. The species is monotypic.

Description

The sexes are alike except that the female has a tiny white spot behind the eye. Adults' upperparts are emerald green, their underparts metallic blue-green, and their tail metallic blue-black with white tips to its feathers. Immatures have a brownish tinge to the head and back.

Distribution and habitat

The green mango is found only on Puerto Rico. It is rare in coastal areas.

Behavior

Movement

The green mango makes altitudinal movements in response to seasonal changes in the timing of flowering.

Feeding

The green mango feeds on both nectar and arthropods. It takes nectar from a wide variety of flowering trees, shrubs, and vines, and males defend flowering trees. Insects are mostly taken on the wing and spiders from leaves and bark. It forages from the low understory to above tree-top level.

Breeding

The green mango's nesting season spans from October to May. It makes a cup nest of soft plant fiber with lichen on the outside. The clutch size is two eggs. The incubation period and time to fledging are not known.

Vocalization

The green mango is not highly vocal. It does have a song, "a repeated high-pitched phrase commencing with a drawn-out buzz, 'szzzzz-szi-szi-chup-tsz-tsz.....'." Its calls include "a repeated short 'tsik' and a high-pitched twittering trill." It makes harsh rattles and chatters during agonistic encounters.

Status

The IUCN has assessed the green mango as being of Least Concern, though its population size and trend are not known. It is considered common in the mountains and "readily accepts man-made habitats" such as coffee platations.

References

See also 

 Fauna of Puerto Rico
 List of birds of Puerto Rico
 List of endemic fauna of Puerto Rico
 List of birds of Vieques
 El Toro Wilderness

Green Mango
Endemic birds of Puerto Rico
green mango
green mango
Taxa named by Louis Jean Pierre Vieillot